Panorama Heights is a census-designated place (CDP) in Tulare County, California. The 2010 United States census reported Panorama Heights's population was 41.

Geography
According to the United States Census Bureau, the CDP covers an area of 0.5 square miles (1.2 km), all of it land.

Demographics
At the 2010 census Panorama Heights had a population of 41. The racial makeup of Panorama Heights was 35 (85.4%) White, 1 (2.4%) African American, 1 (2.4%) Native American, 0 (0.0%) Asian, 0 (0.0%) Pacific Islander, 4 (9.8%) from other races, and 0 (0.0%) from two or more races. Hispanic or Latino of any race were 4 people (9.8%).

The whole population lived in households, no one lived in non-institutionalized group quarters and no one was institutionalized.

There were 22 households, 2 (9.1%) had children under the age of 18 living in them, 13 (59.1%) were opposite-sex married couples living together, 1 (4.5%) had a female householder with no husband present, 1 (4.5%) had a male householder with no wife present.  There were 0 (0%) unmarried opposite-sex partnerships, and 0 (0%) same-sex married couples or partnerships. 7 households (31.8%) were one person and 3 (13.6%) had someone living alone who was 65 or older. The average household size was 1.86.  There were 15 families (68.2% of households); the average family size was 2.27.

The age distribution was 2 people (4.9%) under the age of 18, 1 people (2.4%) aged 18 to 24, 2 people (4.9%) aged 25 to 44, 22 people (53.7%) aged 45 to 64, and 14 people (34.1%) who were 65 or older.  The median age was 58.3 years. For every 100 females, there were 115.8 males.  For every 100 females age 18 and over, there were 116.7 males.

There were 166 housing units at an average density of 349.4 per square mile, of the occupied units 20 (90.9%) were owner-occupied and 2 (9.1%) were rented. The homeowner vacancy rate was 4.8%; the rental vacancy rate was 0%.  37 people (90.2% of the population) lived in owner-occupied housing units and 4 people (9.8%) lived in rental housing units.

References

Census-designated places in Tulare County, California
Census-designated places in California